"Lonely Child" is a song by American rapper YoungBoy Never Broke Again, released on October 11, 2019, as the eleventh track from YoungBoy's twelth mixtape, AI YoungBoy 2. The low tempo trap beat provides the correct melody for YoungBoy to vocalize his feelings regarding his pain from the death of his friend Lil Dave to the hurt from not being able to see his son Kacey to the resentment he feels towards the mother of Kacey, his ex-girlfriend, Jania Binia.

Background
The song was frist released on YouTube and SoundCloud on October 9, 2019, as a surprise release from YoungBoy, however it was re-released through Never Broke Again, Artist Partner Group and Atlantic Records on October 11, 2019, to appear on all digital streaming platforms.

Crtitical reception
On October 11, 2019, "Lonely Child" appeared as Pitchforks "new rap song of the day." Pierre noted that the track "[doubles] down on the crooning that has made him an online sensation" and that he is "rap's most troubled superstar."

Charts

Certifications

References

2019 songs
YoungBoy Never Broke Again songs
Songs written by YoungBoy Never Broke Again